Crème caramel, flan, caramel pudding, condensed milk pudding or caramel custard is a custard dessert with a layer of clear caramel sauce.

History 
The origin of crème caramel (also known originally as flan) can be traced all the way back to the Roman Empire. Originally, this dish was called tiropatinam and it was made with eggs, milk and pepper and it was seasoned in its savoury version with fish, eel, and spinach, although there was also a sweet version with honey. It was in the early Middle Ages, in Spain, when they started using only the ingredients from which the original recipe is made today, and introduced caramelised sugar into the mixture and to call it flan, which comes from the proto-germanic 'flado'.

In the late 20th century crème caramel was common in European restaurants. The food historian Alan Davidson speculates that this may have been because the dish could be prepared in bulk, in advance.

Etymology of names
In this context, crème in French means 'custard'. The names crème (caramel) renversée (French) and crema volteada (Spanish) allude to the custard being turned over to be served.

Both crème caramel ("caramel cream") and flan are French names, but flan has come to have different meanings in different regions.

In Spanish-speaking countries and often in the United States, crème caramel is known as flan. This was originally a Spanish-language usage, but the dish is now best known in North America in a Latin American context. Elsewhere, including in Britain, a flan is a type of tart somewhat like a quiche.

The Modern English word flan comes from French flan, from Old French flaon, in turn from Medieval Latin fladonem, derived from the Old High German flado, a sort of flat cake, probably from an Indo-European root for 'flat' or 'broad'.

Preparation, cooking and presentation

Preparation

Crème caramel is a variant of plain custard (crème) where sugar syrup cooked to caramel stage is poured into the mold before adding the custard base. It is usually cooked in a bain-marie on a stovetop or in the oven in a water bath. It is turned and served with the caramel sauce on top, hence the alternate French names crème (caramel) renversée or crème renversée au caramel. The milk may be flavored with vanilla, cinnamon, or lemon peel.

The resulting texture is gelatinous and creamy.

Turning out larger dishes requires care, as the custard easily splits. Larger dishes also require more care to avoid undercooking the interior or overcooking the exterior. Thus, crème caramel is often cooked and served in individual ramekins. The objective is to obtain a homogeneous and smooth cream on the surface of the crème caramel with a liquid caramel base. Cooking it in a bain-marie avoids burning the caramel.

Imitations
An imitation of crème caramel may be prepared from "instant flan powder", which is thickened with agar or carrageenan rather than eggs. In some Latin American countries, the true custard version is known as "milk flan" (flan de leche) or even "milk cheese", and the substitute version is known as just "flan".

Regional varieties

Argentina and Uruguay 

In Argentina and Uruguay, crème caramel is usually eaten with dulce de leche, whipped cream, or both (flan mixto).

Brazil and Venezuela 
In Venezuela and Brazil, it is often made with condensed milk, milk, eggs, and sugar caramelized on top. The Venezuelan version is known as quesillo ("small cheese") and in Brazil, it is known as pudim, specifically pudim de leite ("milk pudding"). It can have variations of flavor, such as chocolate, coconut, paçoca (peanut candy), cheese, and others, being the condensed milk pudding a base recipe.

Caribbean 
Also at most equatorial and Caribbean countries the inclusion of coconut, condensed milk and evaporated milk is widespread. The milk base may also be flavored with nuts, fruit, and so on.

Chile 
In Chile, Leche asada or 'roasted milk' is similar to Crème caramel because it is made with the same ingredients, but Leche asada has a less smooth texture and is baked directly, which creates a toasted layer on the surface.
In Chile, it is often eaten with dulce de membrillo (quince jelly) or condensed milk.

Costa Rica 
Flan in Costa Rica often features coconut or coffee (flan de café).

Croatia 

In Croatia, rožata, rozata, rožada or rozada is flavored with the Dubrovnik liqueur rozalin (rose liqueur), which gives the cake its characteristic aroma. Modern variations include vanilla and other flavorings.

Cuba 
Cuban flan (flan de Cuba) is made with the addition of the whites of two eggs and a cinnamon stick. A similar Cuban dish is Copa Lolita, a small caramel flan served with one or two scoops of vanilla ice cream. Other variations include coconut or rum raisin topping.

Dominican Republic 
In the Dominican Republic, only egg yolks are used, mixed with vanilla, evaporated milk, and condensed milk. Coconut flan is known as quesillo.

India 

Caramel custard is popular, especially in the larger coastal cities, and in former Portuguese colonies such as Goa, Daman and Diu. Sometimes, masala chai is added on the side. It is a staple on restaurant menus in the beach resorts along India's coasts and also prepared regularly in the home kitchens of the Anglo-Indian Goan, Malayali, Mangalorean and Parsi communities.

Japan 
Packaged crème caramel is ubiquitous in Japanese convenience stores under the name  (i.e., "pudding"), or custard pudding. The same kind of dessert is sold in convenience stores in Taiwan.

Malaysia 
Caramel custard is a very popular dessert in Malaysia. First introduced by the Portuguese in the 16th century and sold year-round today, this dessert is popular served in restaurants, cafes, hotels, and even Ramadan bazaars for breaking the fast.

Mexico 

Flan is extremely popular in Mexico, being made at home, found pre-made at grocery stores, served in restaurants, and even vended on the streets. A variation of the dish called Flan Napolitano is made in some parts of Mexico where cream cheese is added to create a creamier consistency, though it is not as popular or wide spread. Flan's popularity among Mexican-Americans helped the dish become popular in the United States. Another variation is "Flan de Cajeta" which replaces the standard caramel with cajeta (milk caramel with a base of goat milk).

Peru 
In Peru, crema volteada 'flipped cream' may use condensed rather than regular milk. Fruit may also be added, such as lucuma, custard apple, soursop, or granadilla.

Philippines 

In the Philippines, flan is known as leche flan (the local term for the originally Spanish flan de leche, literally "milk flan"), which is a heavier version of the Spanish dish, made with condensed milk and more egg yolks. Leche flan is usually steamed over an open flame or stove top in an oval-shaped tin mold known as llanera (also spelled lyanera) which is also used to make hardinera, although rarely it can also be baked. Leche flan is a staple dessert in celebratory feasts.

An even heavier version, called tocino de cielo or tocino del cielo (Spanish for "heaven's bacon"), is similar, but has significantly more egg yolks and sugar.

Leche flan is also commonly baked into pastries. The most common is the Filipino dessert flan cake or leche flan cake, a Filipino chiffon or sponge cake with a layer of leche flan on top. It can similarly be baked into steamed cupcakes known as puto mamón, a combination known as puto flan.

Portugal 

Known as Pudim flan, made with milk, eggs, caramelized sugar, and vanilla. Variations include orange or lemon zest, cinnamon, pineapple, Port wine, or even bacon as is the case with Pudim Abade de Priscos. It characteristically has a hole in the center.

Puerto Rico 
Most Puerto Rican flans are based on eggs and milk. Egg white and egg yolks are beaten separately with sugar to achieve a light flan. 

Flan cake is known as flancocho and has cream cheese added. 

Spanish lime, piña colada, flan de calabaza, sesame seed milk, and breadfruit. All are uniquely Puerto Rican.

Spain
In Spain, Flan is a typical Spanish dessert, where most of the variations exist. It is a homemade dessert of which you can also find many variations in grocery stores and it is usually served as a dessert in most restaurants. The best known version is the typical 'Flan de huevo' (egg flan), but there are many other versions, such as flan de queso, flan de leche, flan de vainilla, etc. In the original version, the flan has a layer of caramelised sugar that is sometimes crystallised to make it hard.

Vietnam 
Crème caramel was introduced by the French and is common in Vietnam. It is known as bánh lăng, caramen, or kem caramel in northern Vietnam or bánh flan or kem flan in southern Vietnam. Variations include serving with black coffee poured on top, or browning the caramel past typical caramelization point to make a darker, more bitter "burnt caramel".

See also

 Crème brûlée, custard with a hard caramel layer on top
 Leche asada
 Pudim Abade de Priscos, a rich Portuguese variant
 Rožata

References

External links

 Alan Davidson, The Oxford Companion to Food, 1999. .

Custard desserts
World cuisine
French desserts
Spanish desserts
Portuguese desserts
Italian desserts
Croatian desserts
Latin American cuisine
Caribbean cuisine
Indian desserts
Malaysian desserts
Vietnamese desserts
Philippine desserts
Japanese desserts and sweets